The Samsung NX 16-50mm F2.0-2.8 S ED OIS is an interchangeable camera lens announced by Samsung on January 2, 2014. It has one of the widest apertures in a zoom lens, measuring f/2.0 (at 16mm) to f/2.8 (at 50mm). This is narrower than the Sigma 18-35mm f/1.8 DC HSM A, but the Samsung's focal length extends to 50mm, making it more suitable for portraits without cropping.

References
http://www.dpreview.com/products/samsung/lenses/samsung_16_50_2-2p8_ois/specifications

16-50
Camera lenses introduced in 2014